Reuben Liversidge is an Australian actor best known for his role as Anthony in the Australian television series Round The Twist. He is also a performing arts teacher with the Children's Performing Company of Australia, having trained with that company for six years.

References

External links

Australian male film actors
Australian male television actors
Living people
Year of birth missing (living people)